Hottenbaugh Run is a tributary of Neshannock Creek in western Pennsylvania.  The stream rises in east-central Lawrence County and flows south then west entering Neshannock Creek at Painter Hill.  The watershed is roughly 53% agricultural, 40% forested and the rest is other uses.

References

Rivers of Pennsylvania
Tributaries of the Beaver River
Rivers of Lawrence County, Pennsylvania